Valeria Maximilla was the Empress of the Romans and wife of Emperor Maxentius.

Life 
She was the daughter of Emperor Galerius and his first wife, whose name is unknown. She married Maxentius around 293 (the exact date is unknown) in what was likely an attempt to forge an alliance between the families of Galerius and Maxentius' father Maximian, himself Emperor in the West. She bore two sons: the eldest, Valerius Romulus, was born c. 295; the other son's name is not recorded, but might be Aurelius Valerius, was executed in 312. As an emperor's daughter, she was entitled . 

Her husband was acclaimed emperor in October 306 against the wishes of Valeria Maximilla's father, who tried to overthrow the usurper in 307 but without success. Maxentius remained the ruler of Rome, Italy and Africa until 312, when Constantine I invaded Italy. Valeria and her husband were together before the Battle of the Milvian Bridge, when she disappears from the historical record. Her fate is unknown. Their son, Romulus, died in 309.

Valeria Maximilla's portrait does not appear on any of the coinage issued under Maxentius, but she may have been depicted on a defaced sculpture now housed in the Capitoline Museums. If it is of Maximilla, it was likely defaced after her husband's overthrow, when his own images were also defaced.

In St. Catherine's hagiography 
Maximilla may be the nameless queen who appears in the hagiography  of St. Catherine of Alexandria by Jacobus de Voragine (one of the fantastic stories in the "Golden Legend"). In this story, the queen converted to Christianity after meeting with Catherine, and the both of them were then tortured and executed by Maxentius, depicted here as a persecutor of Christians.

In another similar version by 15th-century Italian hagiographer Petrus de Natalibus, the queen was named "Faustina". She was accompanied to Catherine's jail by Porphyrius, an army captain. Along with Faustina, the captain and 200 of his soldiers also converted, and they were all supposedly martyred by Maxentius. In Eastern Orthodox churches, Faustina, Porphyrius (called a stratelates) and the soldiers share a feast day with Catherine: November 24 for the Russian Orthodox Church, and Nov. 25 for the Greek Orthodox Church.

See also
 List of Roman women
 List of Roman empresses

References

 

3rd-century Roman women
4th-century Roman empresses
3rd-century births
4th-century deaths
Valerii
Maxentius
Nobilissimi
Daughters of Roman emperors